Rik Renders (6 November 1922 – 24 December 2008) was a Belgian racing cyclist. He rode in the 1948 Tour de France.

References

External links

1922 births
2008 deaths
Belgian male cyclists
Cyclists from Flemish Brabant
People from Affligem
20th-century Belgian people